Hostess Cake, mostly known simply as Hostess, is a brand under which snack cakes are sold by Hostess Brands. The brand originated in 1919 when the first Hostess CupCake was sold. However, it is better-known as the brand under which Twinkies are sold, after that product appeared in 1930.

The brand was owned by the Continental Baking Company until 1995, when Continental was acquired by Interstate Bakeries Corporation. IBC became "Hostess Brands" in 2009 and began liquidating its assets in 2012 following a strike by the BCTGM union. The defunct business is now known as Old HB. In 2013, the cake business of Hostess Brands was sold to a "new" Hostess Brands owned by private equity firms Apollo Global Management and C. Dean Metropoulos and Company, and Hostess-branded products officially returned on July 15 of that year.

Products and advertisements 
In the 1970s and 1980s, Hostess frequently promoted its snack foods in whole page comic book advertisements in major publishers such as DC Comics, Marvel Comics, Harvey Comics, Archie Comics and Gold Key Comics.

The format featured a complete one page comic strip story, drawn by one of the relevant publisher's artists such as Neal Adams for DC and Frank Miller for Marvel, where major characters from the publisher of the periodical solve a problem with Hostess Brands products. In the DC and Marvel ads, a superhero typically defeats a villain by distracting and/or bribing them with those products, although there is also a series of advertisements individually featuring the supervillains, The Joker and the Penguin, failing to do the same with their enemies.  In the other publishers, their humor focus allowed more varied plots along the same theme.  (This was parodied in Dexter's Laboratory, with the Captain America parody Major Glory from the "Justice Friends" sketch using "Justice Fruit Pies" to thwart his enemy.)

Mascots
The brand had several mascots, all anthropomorphicized versions of their products, most notably Twinkie the Kid, a Twinkie dressed like a wrangler. 

Other mascots include:
 Captain Cupcake
 Fruit Pie the Magician
 Chauncey Chocodile
 Chipper Brownie
 Chief Big Wheels 
 Happy HoHo
 King Ding Dong
 Suzy Q

Products
  Big Wheels
  Brownie Bites
 CupCakes - chocolate with cream filling
 Chocodile Twinkies - chocolate coated sponge cake with creamy filling
 Ding Dongs - hockey puck-shaped chocolate cake with cream filling and chocolate glazing
  Donettes - doughnuts
  Fruit Pies - flaky pastry with flavored custard filling
 Ho Hos - chocolate cake with cream swirl dipped in chocolate, based on the Swiss roll
  Mini Muffins
 Sno Balls - covered with marshmallow frosting and coconut flakes
 Suzy Q's - oblong sandwich of devil's food cake with white crème or banana-flavored filling
 Twinkies - flagship product is a golden sponge cake with creamy filling
  Tiger Tails
 Zingers (originally sold under the Dolly Madison brand) - similar to a Twinkie with creamy filling with icing on top

See also 
 Little Debbie

References

External links

Hostess Brands brands
American desserts
Re-established companies
Snack food manufacturers of the United States
Brand name snack foods
Products introduced in 1919